Voskresenka is a district of Kyiv, the capital of Ukraine, and is a historical region on the left bank of the river Dnipro.

History 

Voskresenka emerged on the base of former village Voskresenska Slobidka (Slobodka) of Oster povit Chernigiv gubernia of Russian empire.

One of the earliest owners of this land was prince and otaman of cossacks of Ukrainian Rus Ostap Dashkevych of Orthodox Christian faith, descendant of Prince Rurik and Czar Genghis, one of the founders of Army of Ukrainian Cossacks (Viysko Zaporizhske), defenders of lives and liberties of Ukrainian people of that time. He donated this lands to the Voskresenska Church (Church of Resurrection of Christ) at Podil in Kyiv from which the village, which emerged on these lands got its name.

Neighborhoods in Kyiv